Alvar is a masculine gives name derived from the Old Norse name Alfarr, formed of the elements alfr ("elf") and arr ("warrior"). The name is now primarily used in Estonia, Finland and Sweden. 

People named Alvar include:
 Alvar Aalto (1898–1976), Finnish architect and artist
 Alvar Johannes Alev (born 1993), Estonian cross-country skier 
 Alvar Lidell (1908–1981) British broadcaster 
 Alvar Suñol (born 1935), Spanish painter, sculptor, and lithographer

References

Germanic masculine given names
Estonian masculine given names
Finnish masculine given names